Taraxerol synthase (RsM2, (S)-2,3-epoxysqualene mutase (cyclizing, taraxerol-forming)) is an enzyme with systematic name (3S)-2,3-epoxy-2,3-dihydrosqualene mutase (cyclizing, taraxerol-forming). This enzyme catalyses the following chemical reaction

 (3S)-2,3-epoxy-2,3-dihydrosqualene  taraxerol

The enzyme gives taraxerol, beta-amyrin and lupeol.

References

External links 
 

EC 5.4.99